Chlorida fasciata is a species of beetle in the family Cerambycidae. It was described by Henry Walter Bates in 1870. It is known to occur in Brazil and Peru.

References

Bothriospilini
Beetles described in 1870
Beetles of South America